Events in the year 2020 in Germany.

Incumbents
President: Frank-Walter Steinmeier 
Chancellor: Angela Merkel

Events

January 
5 January – Beginning of Volleyball at the 2020 Summer Olympics – Men's European qualification
6 January – End of 2019–20 Four Hills Tournament, a ski jumping event co-hosted by Germany and Austria
17 January – Beginning of 2020 Men's EuroHockey Indoor Nations Championship
20 January – Beginning of 2020 German Masters
21 February – 2020 Junior World Luge Championships
24 January – 2020 Rot am See shooting
27 January – The first recorded infection of the COVID-19 pandemic in Germany occurs in Bavaria.

February 
19 February – Hanau shootings
20 February – 70th Berlin International Film Festival
21 February
Beginning of IBSF World Championships 2020
Beginning of 2020 Judo Grand Slam Düsseldorf
22 February – 2020 German Indoor Athletics Championships
23 February – 2020 Hamburg state election: the SPD remains in first place with 39% of the vote.
24 February – Volkmarsen ramming attack
26 February – Beginning of 2020 UCI Track Cycling World Championships

March 
9 March – First death in Essen in COVID-19 pandemic in Germany
12 March – The Federal Office for the Protection of the Constitution (BfV) classified the Flügel a far-right faction within Germany's Alternative for Germany (AfD) as "a right-wing extremist endeavor against the free democratic basic order" that was incompatible with Germany's Basic Law, and placed the group under intelligence surveillance.
16 March – COVID-19 pandemic in Germany; All schools in Germany are closed

April 
20 April – 2020 coronavirus pandemic in Germany, Germany reopens shops with cloth face mask restriction for buyers, but Chancellor Angela Merkel warns of a second coronavirus wave in the country in autumn 2020.
30 April – 2020 coronavirus pandemic in Germany - After a summit between Angela Merkel and state leaders, the federal government allowed opening of museums, monuments, botanical gardens and zoos, and religious services under strict social distancing conditions.

May 
5 May – German Bundesverfassungsgericht decided, that the expanded asset-purchase programme (EAPP) since 2015 by European Central Bank violates German law.
7 May – German parliament Bundestag bans conversion therapy for those under 18 years nationwide and forbids advertising of conversion therapy. It also forbids conversion therapy for adults, if they decided by force, fraud or pressure.
15 May – Germany's Bundestag votes to make the burning of the EU flag or that of another country a hate crime equivalent to that of burning the German flag - carrying a sentence of up to three years in prison. The only major party that opposed the move was the right-wing Alternative for Germany.

July
21 July – The government of Baden-Württemberg bans full-face coverings burqas, niqabs for all school children. the rule will apply to primary and secondary education. Winfried Kretschmann the Ministers-President said that full-face veiling did not belong in a free society.

August 
22 August – Alexai Navalny, a seriously ill Russian opposition leader, is taken to Berlin for treatment.
29 August – hundreds of protesters try to storm the Reichstag. Early in the day tens of thousands protested against government measures for the coronavirus.

September 
2 September – The German government claims to have "unequivocal proof" that Alexai Navalny was poisoned with Novichok.
3 September – 2020 Solingen killings

October 
4 October - 2020 Dresden knife attack

Deaths

January 

2 January – Veronika Fitz, actress (b. 1936).
4 January – Herbert Binkert, footballer (b. 1923).
5 January – Hans Tilkowski, footballer (b. 1935)
10 January – Wolfgang Dauner, jazz pianist (b. 1935)
11 January – Sabine Deitmer, author (b. 1947).
13 January – Sophie Kratzer, ice hockey forward (b. 1989).
16 January – Maik Hamburger, translator, writer and dramaturge (b. 1931).
20 January – Wolfgang J. Fuchs, author and journalist (b. 1945).
21 January
 Herbert Baumann, composer (b. 1925).
 Hermann Korte, academic specialising in German literature (b. 1949).
23 January – Gudrun Pausewang, writer (b. 1928)
24 January – Martin Matschinsky-Denninghoff, sculptor (b. 1921).
29 January
Othmar Mága, dirigent (b. 1929).
Christoph Meckel, author (b. 1935).

February 

4 February – Volker David Kirchner,  violist and composer (b. 1942).
7 February – Lucille Eichengreen, Holocaust survivor and memoirist (b. 1925).
8 February – Volker Spengler, actor (b. 1939).
9 February – Karl-Heinz Rädler, astrophysicist (b. 1935).
11 February – Joseph Vilsmaier, film director (b. 1939).
12 February – Hansjoachim Linde, inspector general (b. 1926).
14 February – Alwin Brück,  politician (b. 1931).
15 February – Karl Ludwig Schweisfurth, businessman (b. 1930).
17 February 
Ror Wolf, writer and poet (b. 1932).
Sonja Ziemann, actress (b. 1926).
20 February – Peter Dreher, painter (b. 1932).
26 February – Hans Deinzer, clarinetist (b. 1934).
27 February – Burkhard Driest, actor, writer and director (b. 1936).

March 

1 March – Carsten Bresch, physicist and geneticist (b. 1921).
2 March 
Tabea Blumenschein, actress (b. 1952).
Viktor Josef Dammertz,   Roman Catholic prelate (b. 1929).
Ulay, performance artist (b. 1943).
Susan Weinert, guitarist (b. 1965).
Peter Wieland, singer and entertainer (b. 1930).
3 March
Freimut Duve, politician and author (b. 1936).
Günther Müller, conductor (b. 1925).
9 March – Dietmar Rothermund, historian (b. 1933).
11 March – Burkhard Hirsch, politician (b. 1930).
12 March – Wolfgang Hofmann, jodoka (b. 1941).
13 March – Giwi Margwelaschwili, German-Georgian writer and philosopher (b. 1927).
21 March – Hellmut Stern, violinist (b. 1928)
24 March – Alfred Gomolka, politician (CDU) (b. 1942).
26 March – Rolf Huisgen, chemist (b. 1920).
28 March – Thomas Schäfer, politician (b. 1966).
31 March – Reimar Lüst, astrophysicist (b. 1923).

April 

1 April – Rüdiger Nehberg, human rights activist and survival expert (b. 1935).
2 April – Oskar Fischer, politician (b. 1923).
12 April – Sascha Hupmann, basketball player (b. 1970).
16 April – Ulrich Kienzle, journalist and author (b. 1936).
19 April – Margit Otto-Crépin, equestrian (b. 1945).
21 April – Florian Schneider, musician (b. 1947)
22 April – Hartwig Gauder, race walker (b. 1954)
23 April – Norbert Blüm, politician (b. 1935).
30 April – Gerhard Zebrowski, footballer (b. 1940).

May 
1 May 
Judith Esser-Mittag, German gynecologist (b. 1921)
Sabine Zimmermann, TV host (b. 1951).
6 May – Herbert Frankenhauser, politician (CSU) (b. 1945).
8 May – Roy Horn, German-American magician and entertainer (b. 1944)
12 May
 Astrid Kirchherr, photograph and artist (b. 1938)
 Hans-Peter Naumann, philologist (b. 1933).
13 May – Rolf Hochhuth, author and playwright (b. 1931)
17 May
 Hermann Fellner, politician (CSU) (b. 1952).
 Hans-Joachim Gelberg, writer and publisher of children's books (b. 1930).
 Peter Thomas, film music composer (b. 1925).
21 May – Julitta Münch, journalist (b. 1959).
25 May – Renate Krößner, actress (b. 1945).
26 May – Irm Hermann, actress (b. 1942).

June 
1 June – Christoph Sydow, journalist (b. 1985).
5 June
 Werner Böhm, musician and singer (b. 1941).
 Friedrich Stelzner, academic surgeon, scientist and educator (b. 1921).
6 June – Dietmar Seyferth, chemist (b. 1929).
7 June – Bettina Heinen-Ayech, painter (b. 1937).
8 June – Klaus Berger, Roman Catholic theologian (b. 1940).
10 June
 Hans Cieslarczyk, football player (b. 1937).
 Hans Mezger, automobile engineer (b. 1929).
11 June – Hermann Salomon, javelin thrower (b. 1938).
15 June – Anton Schlembach, Roman Catholic bishop (b. 1932).
18 June
 Claus Biederstaedt, actor (b. 1928).
 Anna Blume, photograph (b. 1936).
25 June – Peter E. Toschek, experimental physicist (b. 1935).
26 June – Katrin Beinroth, judoka (b. 1981).
29 June – Gernot Endemann, film and television actor (b. 1942).
30 June – Ludwig Finscher, musicologist (b. 1930).

July 

1 July – Georg Ratzinger, Roman Catholic priest and musician (b. 1924).
2 July – Tilo Prückner, German television and film actor.  (b. 1940)
5 July – Willi Holdorf, German football player (b. 1940)
26 July – Hans-Jochen Vogel, lawyer and politician (b. 1926).

August 
3 August – Ralf Metzenmacher, German painter and designer (b. 1964)
7 August – Fred Stillkrauth, German actor (b. 1939)
13 August – Bernd Fischer, German mathematician (b. 1936)
16 August – Georg Volkert, German football player (b. 1945)
28 August
Wolfgang Stahl, German spectroscopist (b. 1956)
Uli Stein, German artist (b. 1946)
30 August – Ingrid Stahmer, Geram politician (SPD) (b. 1942)

September 

18 September – Joachim Kunert, German film director and screenwriter (b. 1929)
22 September – Michael Gwisdek, German actor and film director (b. 1942)
24 September – Gerry Weber, German designer and entrepreneur (b. 1941)
27 September – Wolfgang Clement, German politician (b. 1940)

October 
1 October – Otfried Nassauer, German journalist (b. 1956)
2 October – Heinz Kördell, German football player (b. 1932)
4 October – Günter de Bruyn, German writer (b. 1926)
6 October 
Folker Bohnet, German actor and theatre director (b. 1937)
Herbert Feuerstein, German comedian (b. 1937)
15 October – Tom Maschler, German-born British publisher, founder of the Booker Prize (b. 1933).
25 October – Thomas Oppermann, German politician (b. 1954)

November 
14 November – Peter Pagé, German computer scientist (b. 1939)
15 November – Rudolf Kippenhahn, German astrophysicist (b. 1926)

December 
12 December – Jack Steinberger, German-born American Nobel physicist (b. 1921)

See also

References

 
2020s in Germany
Years of the 21st century in Germany
Germany
Germany